James Cahill may refer to:

 James Cahill (art historian) (1926–2014), American art historian, authority on Chinese art
 James F. Cahill (1926–2008), scuba diving pioneer
 James Cahill (snooker player) (born 1995), English snooker player
 James Edward Cahill (1903–1978), known as Jim Cahill, Australian politician